Sir Vincenzo Frendo Azzopardi CMG was the chief justice of Malta from 1915 to 1919.

References 

Maltese knights
20th-century Maltese judges
Year of birth missing
Year of death missing